The Dudița is a tributary of the river Cigher in Romania. It flows into the Cigher near Chier.

References

Rivers of Romania
Rivers of Arad County